The following is a partial list of the "G" codes for Medical Subject Headings (MeSH), as defined by the United States National Library of Medicine (NLM).

This list continues the information at List of MeSH codes (G04). Codes following these are found at List of MeSH codes (G06). For other MeSH codes, see List of MeSH codes.

The source for this content is the set of 2006 MeSH Trees from the NLM.

– genetic processes

– breeding
  – hybridization, genetic
  – inbreeding
  – consanguinity

– cell division
  – cell nucleus division
  – anaphase
  – chromosome segregation
  – nondisjunction, genetic
  – meiosis
  – meiotic prophase i
  – chromosome pairing
  – synaptonemal complex
  – pachytene stage
  – metaphase
  – mitosis
  – anaphase
  – metaphase
  – prometaphase
  – prophase
  – telophase
  – prometaphase
  – prophase
  – meiotic prophase i
  – chromosome pairing
  – synaptonemal complex
  – pachytene stage
  – telophase

– dna damage
  – chromosome breakage
  – dna fragmentation

– dna methylation

– dna packaging
  – chromatin assembly and disassembly

– dna repair
  – sos response (genetics)

– dna replication
  – dna replication timing
  – s phase

– evolution
  – evolution, molecular
  – genetic speciation

– gene expression
  – protein biosynthesis
  – transcription, genetic
  – reverse transcription

– gene expression regulation
  – chromatin assembly and disassembly
  – dosage compensation, genetic
  – x chromosome inactivation
  – down-regulation
  – epigenesis, genetic
  – epistasis, genetic
  – frameshifting, ribosomal
  – gene amplification
  – gene expression regulation, archaeal
  – gene expression regulation, bacterial
  – gene expression regulation, developmental
  – gene expression regulation, enzymologic
  – enzyme induction
  – enzyme repression
  – gene expression regulation, fungal
  – gene expression regulation, neoplastic
  – gene expression regulation, leukemic
  – gene expression regulation, plant
  – gene expression regulation, viral
  – gene silencing
  – rna interference
  – genomic imprinting
  – protein modification, translational
  – protein processing, post-translational
  – protein isoprenylation
  – protein splicing
  – rna processing, post-transcriptional
  – rna 3' end processing
  – polyadenylation
  – rna editing
  – rna splicing
  – alternative splicing
  – trans-splicing
  – trans-activation (genetics)
  – up-regulation

– gene rearrangement
  – gene rearrangement, b-lymphocyte
  – gene rearrangement, b-lymphocyte, heavy chain
  – immunoglobulin class switching
  – gene rearrangement, b-lymphocyte, light chain
  – gene rearrangement, t-lymphocyte
  – gene rearrangement, alpha-chain t-cell antigen receptor
  – gene rearrangement, beta-chain t-cell antigen receptor
  – gene rearrangement, delta-chain t-cell antigen receptor
  – gene rearrangement, gamma-chain t-cell antigen receptor

– heredity

– mutagenesis
  – dna repeat expansion
  – trinucleotide repeat expansion
  – gene amplification
  – gene duplication
  – inversion, chromosome
  – mutagenesis, insertional
  – nondisjunction, genetic
  – sequence deletion
  – chromosome deletion
  – gene deletion
  – somatic hypermutation, immunoglobulin
  – suppression, genetic
  – translocation, genetic

– recombination, genetic
  – conjugation, genetic
  – crossing over, genetic
  – gene conversion
  – gene fusion
  – oncogene fusion
  – gene transfer, horizontal
  – sister chromatid exchange
  – transduction, genetic
  – transfection
  – transformation, bacterial
  – transformation, genetic
  – transformation, bacterial

– selection (genetics)

– sex determination (genetics)

– virus integration
  – lysogeny

The list continues at List of MeSH codes (G06).

MeSH
G05